Southern Cotton Oil Company, also known as Columbia Mill, was a historic cottonseed oil complex located at Columbia, South Carolina. The complex was built between 1887 and 1919.  It consisted of seven industrial buildings: the Seed House, Linter Room, Press Room, Machine Shop, Oil House, Cotton Storage Room, and Storage Shed. Five of the buildings were constructed of brick and the other two were constructed of galvanized sheet metal.  The complex has been demolished.

It was added to the National Register of Historic Places in 1996.

References

Industrial buildings and structures on the National Register of Historic Places in South Carolina
Industrial buildings completed in 1887
Buildings and structures in Columbia, South Carolina
National Register of Historic Places in Columbia, South Carolina
Cottonseed oil
Demolished buildings and structures in South Carolina
Cotton industry in the United States